Matraman is a district (kecamatan) of East Jakarta, Indonesia. Matraman is the smallest district of East Jakarta.  The boundaries of Matraman are: Bekasi Barat Raya Road to the south, Prof Wiyoto Witono MSc Highway to the east, Pramuka Road to the north, and Ciliwung River to the west.

Kelurahan (Administrative Villages)
The district of Matraman is divided into six Kelurahan ("Administrative Villages"):
Pisangan Baru - area code 13110
Utan Kayu Selatan - area code 13120
Utan Kayu Utara - area code 13120
Kayu Manis - area code 13130
Pal Meriam - area code 13140
Kebon Manggis - area code 13150

List of important places

Gereja St Yosep ("St Joseph Church")
 Jatinegara Station
Pasar Burung Pramuka (Pramuka Birds Market)
Pasar Pramuka (Pramuka Market), medicines wholesale market 
Gramedia Matraman Bookstores
Matraman Station

Districts of Jakarta
East Jakarta